Caloptilia chalcodelta is a moth of the family Gracillariidae. It is endemic to New Zealand. The larvae of this species mine and fold leaves of species in the genus Nestegis.

References

chalcodelta
Moths of New Zealand
Moths described in 1889
Taxa named by Edward Meyrick
Endemic fauna of New Zealand
Endemic moths of New Zealand